The Europe/Africa Zone was one of the three zones of the regional Davis Cup competition in 2000.

In the Europe/Africa Zone there were four different tiers, called groups, in which teams competed against each other to advance to the upper tier. The top two teams in Group IV advanced to the Europe/Africa Zone Group III in 2001. All other teams remained in Group IV.

Participating nations

Draw
 Venue: Accra Sports Stadium, Accra, Ghana
 Date: 14–20 February

Group A

Group B

1st to 4th place play-offs

5th to 8th place play-offs

Final standings

  and  promoted to Group III in 2001.

Round robin

Group A

Algeria vs. Andorra

Algeria vs. Liechtenstein

Andorra vs. Sudan

Algeria vs. Sudan

Andorra vs. Liechtenstein

Liechtenstein vs. Sudan

Group B

Ghana vs. Azerbaijan

Mauritius vs. Cameroon

Ghana vs. Mauritius

Azerbaijan vs. Cameroon

Ghana vs. Cameroon

Azerbaijan vs. Mauritius

1st to 4th place play-offs

Semifinals

Mauritius vs. Algeria

Ghana vs. Andorra

Final

Mauritius vs. Ghana

3rd to 4th play-off

Algeria vs. Andorra

5th to 8th place play-offs

5th to 8th play-offs

Liechtenstein vs. Azerbaijan

Cameroon vs. Sudan

5th to 6th play-off

Azerbaijan vs. Cameroon

7th to 8th play-off

Liechtenstein vs. Sudan

References

External links
Davis Cup official website

Davis Cup Europe/Africa Zone
Europe Africa Zone Group IV